Bryansburn Rangers Football Club is a Northern Irish, intermediate football club playing in Division 1B of the Northern Amateur Football League. The club are from Bangor, County Down and play their home matches at Ballywooley Park on the Crawfordsburn Road. The club was founded in 1974 and joined the Amateur League in 1984.

Bryansburn field 3 senior teams in total. As well as the first team, there is a second team playing in Northern Amateur Football League Division 3D along with 3rd team that compete in the Down Area League, Divisions 1. The first team were promoted to Division 1A at the end of 2009–10 season, however 2 back to back relegation's left the team in 1C. After a number of years in 1C, the 1st team gained promotion once again to 1B in the 17/18 season, finishing runners up to 18th Newtownabbey Old Boys F.C.

The club competes in a number of cup competitions in Northern Ireland, such as the Steel & Sons Cup, the Irish Cup, the Irish Intermediate Cup, the Clarence Cup and the Border Cup.

The club appointed Noel Clements as their 1st team manager on 7 June 2022. Noel had previous been the clubs 2nd team manager and due to his efforts and success was promoted.

Squad 2021-2022

 (on loan from Glentoran F.C.)

Honours

Intermediate honours

Northern Amateur Football League 1C
2017/18 (Runners up)

Junior honours
Northern Amateur Football League 2C: 2
1996/97
2000/01

Notable events 
On Sunday 29 March 2015, in the lead up to the UEFA Euro 2016 qualifier between Northern Ireland national football team and Finland national football team, Bryansburns home ground 'Ballywooley' was used as a venue for the fans game between the Northern Ireland and Finland fans teams. Former Northern Ireland international Keith Gillespie who made a guest appearance for the Northern Ireland fans team. Northern Ireland ran out eventual 3-1 winners.

Notable former players
 Josh Magennis, international professional footballer from Northern Ireland, currently playing for Hull City in the English Championship.

Notes

Club officials 
Chairman: Alan Dempster 
Secretary: Jordan Parkes 
Treasurer: Davy Armstrong 
Groundsmen: Alex Jones 
1st team Manager: Ross Gray 
1st team assistant Managers: Ross Stevenson, Johnny Ferris 
Club Captain: Alan McMullan 
2nd team Manager: Noel Clements 
3rd team Manager: Gary Beattie

External links
 Bryansburn Rangers Official Club website
 nifootball.co.uk - (For fixtures, results and tables of all Northern Ireland amateur football leagues)

Association football clubs in Northern Ireland
Association football clubs established in 1973
Association football clubs in County Down
Northern Amateur Football League clubs
1973 establishments in Northern Ireland